Zimmeriana is a genus of gynodiastylid cumacean. It is found from New South Wales to Western Australia, and in Japan. It contains 6 species, as of March, 2017.

Description

Zimmeriana females and sub-adult males have two pseudorostral lobes which are horizontal. The eye lobes have no lenses, and may or may not have a pair of spines. The first antenna is small to moderate in size. The first pereopod has a brush of many long setae terminally on the dactyl.

In males, the pseudorostral lobes are horizontally or vertically directed. Eye lobes with or without lenses. The second antenna's peduncle has 4 articles, and the flagellum has 7 articles. There are exopods on the third maxilliped and pereopod 1-4.

Species

Zimmeriana has 6 currently (March, 2017) accepted species:

Zimmeriana azumai Gamô, 1986
Zimmeriana lasiodactylum Zimmer, 1914
Zimmeriana longirostris Hale, 1946
Zimmeriana robustacrus Gerken, 2001
Zimmeriana spinicauda Hale, 1946
Zimmeriana vibrissa Gerken, 2001

References

Cumacea